The 5000 metres at the Summer Olympics has been contested since the fifth edition of the multi-sport event. The men's 5000 m has been present on the Olympic athletics programme since 1912. The 3000 metres was the first women's Olympic long-distance track event, making its initial appearance at the 1984 Olympics, and this distance was extended to match the men's event from 1996 onwards. It is the most prestigious 5000 m race at elite level. The competition format typically has two qualifying heats leading to a final between fifteen athletes.

The Olympic records for the event are 12:57.82 minutes for men, set by Kenenisa Bekele in 2008, and 14:26.17 minutes for women, set by Vivian Cheruiyot in 2016. At the inaugural 1912 Olympic 5000 metres, Hannes Kolehmainen set the first official IAAF world record for the event. However, this remains the only time that the 5000 metres world record has been broken in Olympic competition. The best time recorded for the women's Olympic 3000 m was 8:26.53 minutes by Tetyana Dorovskikh (then Samolenko) at the 1988 Seoul Olympics; the world record for that event was not improved during an Olympic race.

Only three athletes have won multiple titles in the event. Lasse Virén became the first with his back-to-back wins in 1972 and 1976, while Meseret Defar became the first woman to win two titles in 2012, having previously won in 2004. Mo Farah became the third person with multiple titles, and the second with back-to-back wins, in 2012 and 2016. Three athletes have reached the podium on three occasions: Defar was also the 2008 bronze medallist, Tirunesh Dibaba won medals from 2004–2012, and Paavo Nurmi won medals in the period from 1920–1928. Historically, athletes in this event have also had success in the 10,000 metres at the Olympics. The winner of the men's Olympic 5000 m has completed a long-distance track double on nine occasions, the most recent being Farah at the 2016 Rio Olympics. Tirunesh Dibaba is the only woman to complete this double, having done so at the 2008 Beijing Olympics.

Ethiopia is the most successful nation in the event, having taken six gold medals and fifteen medals in total. The next most successful nation, depending on definition, is either Finland or Kenya. In terms of gold medals, Finland is equal with Ethiopia at six, but has a total of twelve overall medals to Ethiopia's 15. Finland's period of great success in the 1920s and 1930s led to the wide usage of the nickname the Flying Finns; Kaarlo Maaninka was the last Finnish athlete to medal over 5000 m, in 1980. Kenya have won fourteen medals in the 5000 m, second only to Ethiopia in total medals in the event, although John Ngugi and Vivian Cheruiyot are the only Kenyans to have won Olympic gold.

Medal summary

Men

Multiple medalists

Medals by country

 The German total includes teams both competing as Germany and the United Team of Germany, but not East or West Germany.

Women's 3000 metres

Multiple medalists

Medalists by country

Women's 5000 metres

Multiple medalists

Medalists by country

References
Participation and athlete data
Athletics Men's 5000 metres Medalists. Sports Reference. Retrieved on 2014-02-07.
Athletics Women's 5000 metres Medalists. Sports Reference. Retrieved on 2014-02-07.
Athletics Women's 3000 metres Medalists. Sports Reference. Retrieved on 2014-02-07.
Olympic record progressions
Mallon, Bill (2012). TRACK & FIELD ATHLETICS – OLYMPIC RECORD PROGRESSIONS. Track and Field News. Retrieved on 2014-02-07.
Specific

External links
IAAF 5000 metres homepage
Official Olympics website
Olympic athletics records from Track & Field News

 
Olympics
5000 metres